Samuel Nikaj (born 2 November 1977 in Shkodër) is an Albanian football coach and former player, who is the current manager of Liria in the First Football League of Kosovo.

Managerial career
Nikaj was appointed manager of Vushtrria in summer 2018 and took charge of fellow Kosovans Liria in June 2019.

References

1977 births
Living people
Footballers from Shkodër
Albanian footballers
Association football midfielders
Albanian football managers
KF Vllaznia Shkodër managers
KF Tërbuni Pukë managers
Besëlidhja Lezhë managers
KF Flamurtari managers
KS Kastrioti managers
KF Vushtrria managers
KF Liria managers
Kategoria Superiore managers
Albanian expatriate football managers
Expatriate football managers in Kosovo
Albanian expatriate sportspeople in Kosovo